Tulay-e Pain (also Romanized as Ţūlāy-e Pā’īn; also known as Ţīūlā-ye Pā’īn) is a village in Eshkevar-e Sofla Rural District, Rahimabad District, Rudsar County, Gilan Province, Iran. At the 2006 census, its population was 58, in 23 families.

References 

Populated places in Rudsar County